Domenico Gorla (born 7 February 1965) is a retired Italian sprinter who specialized in the 100 metres.

Biography
He finished seventh in 4x100 m relay at the 1987 World Championships, with teammates Ezio Madonia, Paolo Catalano and Pierfrancesco Pavoni. His personal best 100 metres time is 10.44 seconds, achieved in June 1989 in Trento. His personal best 200 metres time is 21.00 seconds, achieved in July 1985 in Rome.

Achievements

See also
 Italy national relay team

References

External links
 
Athlete profile at The-sports.org

1965 births
Living people
Italian male sprinters
World Athletics Championships athletes for Italy